Lily Christine is a 1932 British drama film directed by Paul L. Stein and starring Corinne Griffith, Colin Clive and Margaret Bannerman.

It was made at British and Dominion Elstree Studios by Paramount Pictures.

Cast
Corinne Griffith as Lily Christine Summerset  
Colin Clive as Rupert Harvey  
Margaret Bannerman as Mrs. Abbey  
Miles Mander as Ambatriadi  
Jack Trevor as Ivor Summerset  
Anne Grey as Muriel Harvey  
Barbara Everest as Hempel 
Freddie Bartholomew as Child
Peter Graves

References

Bibliography
Low, Rachael. Filmmaking in 1930s Britain. George Allen & Unwin, 1985.

External links

1932 films
British drama films
1932 drama films
Films directed by Paul L. Stein
Films shot at Imperial Studios, Elstree
Paramount Pictures films
British black-and-white films
1930s British films